Polog valley is an area of north-west Macedonia.

Polog may refer to:
 Polog, Mostar, a village in Bosnia and Herzegovina
 Polog Statistical Region, a statistical region of Macedonia

See also 
 Eparchy of Polog and Kumanovo
 Diocese of Polog and Kumanovo
 
 Polog, Mostar
 Pollog, Glasgow